Huilong is a town of Xingren County in southwestern Guizhou province, China, situated  northeast of the county seat. , it has one residential community and 12 villages under its administration.

References

Towns in Guizhou